Other Voices may refer to:

Film and television
 Other Voices (1970 film), a 1970 documentary film
 Other Voices (2000 film), a 2000 American thriller film
 Other Voices (Irish TV series), a series based around a music festival in Dingle, County Kerry
 Other Voices (Canadian TV series) (1964–1965), a Canadian current affairs television series on CBC
 Other Voices, a two-part episode from the animated series Beast Wars: Transformers

Fiction
 Other Voices (journal), an electronic journal of cultural criticism and cultural studies
 Other Voices, Inc., a non-profit literary press encompassing: 
Other Voices (magazine) (a fiction-focused literary magazine)
OV Books (a fiction book imprint)

Music
 Other Voices Records, a Russian record label
 Other Voices (The Doors album), 1971 (recorded and released after the death of frontman Jim Morrison)
 Other Voices (Paul Young album), 1990
 "Other Voices", a song by The Cure from the 1981 album Faith
 "Other Voices", a song by LCD Soundsystem from the 2017 album American Dream

See also
 Other Voices, Other Rooms (disambiguation)